Dušan Zivlak (Nakovo, 1950) is a Serbian painter.

Biography
He was educated in Nakovo and Kikinda and graduated from Faculty of Fine Arts of University of Arts in Belgrade. He is a painter and sculptor. He has lived in Paris since 1950. He has been a member of La Maison des Artistes de Paris since 1983. His key activities are figurative painting (acrylic, oil, combined techniques) and drawing (graphite pencil, pastels, crayons, combined techniques). By making his painting come to life via a spirit of estranged meetings, unconnectable connections and genre sacrilege, Dušan Zivlak has not strived towards a new order, new hierarchy of values and goals that would only put new clothes on old normativism. From one painting to the next, Zivlak surrenders his artistic coordinates, grafting of his figures, items and legends, his “bricolage” of scenes, themes, styles and motifs to a spontaneous, almost wild montage of attraction and distraction, addition and bursts, in which the artistic scene in a way incorporates the viewer.
In the present artistic moment, in the conditions of developed pluralism, an option that Dušan Zivlak stands for in his art has a full-fledged legitimacy. His paintings are a true conglomerate of contemporary artistic information, and it contains a significant dose of visual artistic energy that affects the perception of a viewer in a suggestive manner. That energy is built out of numerous individual pieces of data in a painting, all combined using a technique of collage, and is built out of impulses of everyday life broken through a prism of the artist, as well as the awareness of the civilization meaning of art and its sense.
In 2011, Dušan Zivlak was invited to be a guest lecturer at Université des Beaux-Arts (Kede College of Capital Normal University) in Beijing, China. There, he took part in a conference and display titled The Art of Global Communication, and received an honorary academic title at Université des Beaux-Arts of Kede College of Capital Normal University, Beijing.

Most important exhibits 

 2014 Galerie des Abbesses-Agence Le Groуpe David Immobilier, Paris.
 2013 Galerie des Abbesses-Agence Le Groуpe David Immobilier, Paris.
 2013 Exposition «30 ans dу Carré aуx Artistes de La Place dу Tertre »Mairie dу 18e Paris.
 2012 Galerie des Abbesses-Agence Le Groуpe David Immobilier, Paris.
 2012 Galerie Andrea Andriya, Paris.
 2011 The Art of Global Communication.
 2011 Exposition de L’Art Centre de L’American International Culture & Art ASSN, Nanning( Chine).
 2011 Galerie IMAGES DE FER - La Palette, l’exposition collective, Paris.
 2010 Galerie Andrea Andriya, Paris.
 2009 Galerie Andrea Andriya, Paris.
 2007 Exécuté des peintures une commande pour le restaurant "Gold Cost ", Paris.
 2004 La Salle Saint - Pierre de Montmartre, l'exposition collective, Paris.
 2003 La Salle Saint - Pierre de Montmartre, l'exposition collective, Paris.
1999 Galerie Andrea Andriya, Paris.
 1997 Galerie de Montmartre, Paris.
 1996 Galerie de Montmartre, Paris.
 1995 Galerie La Palette du Peintre, Paris.
 1991 Salon Tribine mladih, Novi Sad (Serbia).
 1991 Galerie Kov, Vršac (Serbia).
 1991 Galerija savremene umentosti, Sombor (Serbia).
 1991 Dom kulture, Banja Luka (Bosnia and Herzegovina).

Dušan Zivlak took part in many collective exhibitions in Belgrade, Karlovac, Prizren and Paris.

References

Links 

 Official site of Dušan Zivlak
 
 
 
 

1950 births
Living people
Serbian painters
University of Arts in Belgrade alumni